Luis Miguel Coronel Gámez, better known as Luis Coronel, is an American singer of Regional Mexican music.

Career
Luis Coronel uploaded tons of videos of himself singing, but one caught the eye of Del Records. He recorded himself singing to his girlfriend at the time and uploaded it to his Facebook account by using the computer that was in the boxing gym. He was signed by Del Records at the age of sixteen.

Music
Some of his singles,  including "Mi niña traviesa," "Será más fácil," and "Escápate," have reached spots on Billboard charts. In September 2013, he released his debut album, Con la frente en alto, and within three weeks of its release, it earned a spot on the Billboard Regional Mexican Albums chart. It was certified gold in the Latin field by the RIAA for shipping 30,000 copies. Coronel won the award for "New Artist of the Year" at the 2014 Latin Billboard Music Awards. He garnered a nomination for Male Artist of the Year in the Regional Mexican category at the 27th Lo Nuestro Awards.

Discography

Studio albums

Awards and nominations

References

External links 
 

Living people
Musicians from Tucson, Arizona
American musicians of Mexican descent
American male singers
American banda musicians
Spanish-language singers of the United States
Singers from Arizona
1996 births
Hispanic and Latino American musicians
Sony Music Latin artists